Highway 934 is a provincial highway in the Canadian province of Saskatchewan. It runs from Highway 912 to a dead end.

See also 
Roads in Saskatchewan
Transportation in Saskatchewan

References 

934